Heinz Hochhauser (born 6 February 1947) is an Austrian football manager.

References

1947 births
Living people
Austrian football managers
LASK managers
FC Blau-Weiß Linz managers
SV Ried managers
FK Austria Wien managers
FC Kärnten managers
People from Wels
Sportspeople from Upper Austria